The 1943 Tour de Hongrie was the 13th edition of the Tour de Hongrie cycle race and was held from 24 to 26 June 1943. The race started in Budapest and finished in Kolozsvár. The race was won by István Liszkay.

Route

General classification

Notes and references

1943
Tour de Hongrie
Tour de Hongrie